Mischa Zverev was the defending champion but lost in the quarterfinals to Rohan Bopanna.

Bopanna went on to win the tournament, defeating Danish qualifier Martin Pedersen in the final, 6–4, 6–3.

Seeds

Draw

Finals

Top half

Bottom half

References

External links
 Singles Draw
 Official ATP

Irish Open